"Clearly Canadian" is a song recorded by Canadian country music artist George Fox. It was released in 1992 as the first single from his fourth studio album, Mustang Heart. It peaked at number 9 on the RPM Country Tracks chart in December 1992.

Chart performance

References

1992 songs
1992 singles
George Fox songs
Warner Music Group singles
Songs written by George Fox (singer)
Songs written by Bob Gaudio
Song recordings produced by Bob Gaudio
Songs about Canada